Rudie Kemna (born 5 October 1967) is a Dutch former racing cyclist, who is currently a directeur sportif for .

Major results

1989
 3rd Ronde van Midden-Nederland
1991
 1st Stage 5 Teleflex Tour
1996
 1st Ronde van Noord-Holland
 1st Stage 3 Boland Bank Tour
 2nd Ronde van Overijssel
1997
 1st Ronde van Overijssel
 1st Omloop der Kempen
 1st Stages 2 & 7 Sachsen Tour
 1st Stage 4 Teleflex Tour
 1st GP Wieler Revue
1998
 4th Ronde van Overijssel
1999
 1st Stages 1 & 4 Ster ZLM Toer
 1st Stage 3 Ronde van Nederland
 1st Woudenomloop
 2nd Dwars door Gendringen
 2nd Grand Prix Rudy Dhaenens
 3rd Ronde van Drenthe
 6th Overall Olympia's Tour
1st Stages 1, 7, 8 & 9
 9th GP Aarhus
2000
 5th Kampioenschap van Vlaanderen
 6th Overall Olympia's Tour
1st Stage 1
 7th Ronde van Noord-Holland
2001
 1st GP Herning
 1st Ster van Zwolle
 1st Stage 3 Course de la Solidarité Olympique
 1st Stage 6 Ster Elektrotoer
 2nd Road race, National Road Championships
 2nd Arnhem–Veenendaal Classic
 3rd Henk Vos Memorial
 7th GP Rudy Dhaenens
 8th Ronde van Noord-Holland
2002
 1st Ronde van Noord-Holland
 1st Ronde van Drenthe
 1st GP Herning
 1st Stage 2 Ster Elektrotoer
 2nd Road race, National Road Championships
 3rd Overall Tour of Qatar
 4th Dwars door Gendringen
 4th Trofeo Cala Millor-Cala Bona
 5th Overall Circuit Franco-Belge
 5th Tour Beneden-Maas
 7th Nokere Koerse
 9th Scheldeprijs
2003
 1st  Road race, National Road Championships
 1st Ronde van Drenthe
 4th Trofeo Manacor
 5th Overall Tour of Rhodes
1st Stage 4
 5th Trofeo Cala Millor-Cala Bona
 8th Nokere Koerse
 10th Brussels–Ingooigem
 10th Ronde van Noord-Holland
2004
 1st Noord-Nederland Tour (tied with 21 riders)
 2nd Nokere Koerse
 2nd Grand Prix Rudy Dhaenens
 4th Road race, National Road Championships
 9th Trofeo Alcudia
2005
 3rd Nationale Sluitingsprijs
 5th Road race, National Road Championships
 6th Tour de Rijke
 8th Ronde van Overijssel

References

1967 births
Living people
Dutch male cyclists
People from Oldenzaal
Cyclists from Overijssel